Kherson Oil Refinery (OJSC "Kherson Refinery") is the third largest oil refinery in Ukraine, can annually process 7.1 million tons of oil as of 2005. It was built in 1938.

See also

 List of oil refineries

References

Companies established in 1938
Companies of Ukraine by city
Economy of Ukraine by city
1938 in Ukraine
History of Kherson Oblast
Oil refineries in Ukraine
Oil refineries in the Soviet Union